Y Punto is the first album by the Argentine rock band Bersuit Vergarabat, released in 1992.

Track listing
"El Tiempo No Para" (Cazuza-Brandao) [Time Doesn't Stop] – 5:16
"La Papita" (Cordera) [The Potato] – 3:17
"Diez Mil" (Martín, Bianco) [Ten Thousand] – 4:18
"Tuyu" (Cordera) – 4:45
"Homenaje A Los Locos Del Borda" (Cordera, Subirá) [Homage to Borda's Madmen] – 4:00
"Venganza De Los Muertos Pobres (Afro)" (Cordera) [Revenge of the Poor Dead People] – 5:33
"Hociquito De Ratón" (Cordera) [Little Mouse Nose] – 2:35
"La Logia (Iambo-Iombo)" (Cordera, Bianco, Jara) [The Logia] – 4:00
"Como Nada Puedo Hacer" (Cordera, Céspedes) [Since I Can't Do Anything] – 5:38
"Sistema Al Mejor Postor" (Cordera) [System to the Best Bidder] – 5:08

Personnel
Gustavo Cordera - vocals
Charly Bianco – guitar
Oscar Humberto Righi – guitar
Carlos E. Martín – drums
Rene Isel Céspedes – Bass, backing vocals
Ruben Sadrinas – backing vocals
Juan Subirá – keyboards
Marcela Chedik – percussion

1992 debut albums
Bersuit Vergarabat albums